Colonel William Smith Gill CB VD DL (16 February 1865 – 25 December 1957) was a Scottish Volunteer Force officer and paint manufacturer.

Early life 
Born at Old Machar, Peterculter, Aberdeenshire, Gill was the son of Alexander Ogston Gill (1832–1908) and his wife, Barbara Smith Marr (1843–1898).

Career 
In the 1880s, Gill became an officer of the Aberdeen Volunteers, and between 1908 and 1910 he was Colonel Commanding the Highland Division Royal Engineers (Territorial Force). By 1896, Gill was a partner with his father in Farquhar & Gill, paint manufacturers. 

In 1925, Gill was appointed as a Deputy lieutenant of Aberdeen.

Gill died in 1957 at Dalhebity in Bieldside, Aberdeenshire, aged 92. He was buried in Peterculter Cemetery, Aberdeen.

Marriage and issue 
On 30 June 1898, at Queen's Cross Church, Aberdeen, Gill married Ruth Littlejohn, a daughter of David Littlejohn, DL (1841-1924) and his wife, Jane Crombie (1843-1917). They had five children:

Alexander Ogston Gill (1900–1982)
Jean Forbes Gill (1901–1987)
Elizabeth Penelope Gill (1904–1995)
Ruth Sylvia Gill (1908–1993), mother of Frances Shand Kydd and grandmother of Diana, Princess of Wales,  Charles Spencer, 9th Earl Spencer, Lady Sarah McCorquodale, and Jane, Lady Fellowes
William David Littlejohn Gill (1915–1999)

Notes

1865 births
1957 deaths
People from Aberdeen
Companions of the Order of the Bath
Royal Engineers officers
Deputy Lieutenants of Aberdeen